Richard A. Horsley was the Distinguished Professor of Liberal Arts and the Study of Religion at the University of Massachusetts Boston until his retirement in 2007.

He described his view of the historical Jesus in these words (Jesus and the Spiral of Violence, pp. 207–208):
 
The focal concern of the kingdom of God in Jesus’ preaching and practice, however, is the liberation and welfare of the people. Jesus’ understanding of the "kingdom of God" is similar in its broader perspective to the confident hopes expressed in then-contemporary Jewish apocalyptic literature. That is, he had utter confidence that God was restoring the life of the society, and that this would mean judgment for those who oppressed the people and vindication for those who faithfully adhered to God’s will and responded to the kingdom. That is, God was imminently and presently effecting a historical transformation. In modern parlance that would be labeled a "revolution."

Horsley has a PhD from Harvard and previously taught at Wesleyan University.

Bibliography
 1970. "Paul and the Pneumatikoi: First Corinthians Investigated in Terms of the Conflict between Two Different Religious Mentalities." PhD diss., Harvard University.
 1985. With John S. Hanson. Bandits, Prophets, and Messiahs: Popular Movements in the Time of Jesus. Minneapolis: Winston. Reprint, Harrisburg, PA: Trinity, 1999.
 1987. Jesus and the Spiral of Violence: Popular Jewish Resistance in Roman Palestine. San Francisco: Harper & Row. Reprint, Minneapolis: Fortress, 1993.
 1988. Sociology and the Jesus Movement. New York: Crossroad.
 1989. The Liberation of Christmas: The Infancy Narratives in Social Context. New York: Crossroad. Reprint, Eugene, OR: Wipf & Stock, 2006.
 1995. Galilee: History, Politics, People. Harrisburg, PA: Trinity.
 1996. Archaeology, History, and Society in Galilee: The Social Context of Jesus and the Rabbis. Harrisburg, PA: Trinity.
 1997. And Neil Asher Silberman. The Message and the Kingdom: How Jesus and Paul Ignited a Revolution and Transformed the Ancient World. New York: Grossett/Putnam. Reprint, Minneapolis: Fortress, 2002.
 1997. Editor. Paul and Empire: Religion and Power in Roman Imperial Society. Harrisburg, PA: Trinity.
 1998. 1 Corinthians. Abingdon New Testament Commentaries. Nashville: Abingdon.
 1999. With Jonathan A. Draper. Whoever Hears You Hears Me: Prophets, Performance, and Tradition in Q. Harrisburg, PA: Trinity.
 2001. Hearing the Whole Story: The Politics of Plot in Mark's Gospel. Louisville: Westminster John Knox.
 2003. Jesus and Empire: The Kingdom of God and the New World Disorder. Minneapolis: Fortress.
 2003. And Tom Thatcher. John, Jesus, and the Renewal of Israel. Grand Rapids: Eerdmans.
 2003. Religion and Empire: People, Power, and the Life of the Spirit. Facets. Minneapolis: Fortress.
 2004. Editor. Hidden Transcripts and the Arts of Resistance: Applying the Work of James C. Scott to Jesus and Paul. Semeia Studies 48. Atlanta: Society of Biblical Literature.
 2004. Paul and the Roman Imperial Order. New York: Trinity.
 2005. Editor. Christian Origins. A People's History of Christianity 1. Minneapolis: Fortress.
 2006. Editor. Oral Performance, Popular Tradition, and Hidden Transcript in Q. Semeia Studies 60. Atlanta: Society of Biblical Literature.
 2007. Scribes, Visionaries, and the Politics of Second Temple Judea. Louisville: Westminster John Knox.
 2008. Jesus in Context: Power, People, and Performance. Minneapolis: Fortress.
 2008. Wisdom and Spiritual at Corinth: Studies in First Corinthians. Eugene, OR: Cascade Books.
 2009. Covenant Economics: A Biblical Vision of Justice for All. Louisville: Westminster John Knox.
 2010. Revolt of the Scribes: Resistance and Apocalyptic Origins. Minneapolis: Fortress.
 2011. Jesus and the Powers: Conflict, Covenant, and the Hope of the Poor. Minneapolis: Fortress.
 2012. With Patrick A. Tiller. After Apocalyptic and Wisdom: Rethinking Texts in Context. Eugene, OR: Cascade Books.
 2012. The Prophet Jesus and the Renewal of Israel: Moving beyond Diversionary Debate. Grand Rapids: Eerdmans.
 2013. Jesus and the Politics of Roman Palestine. Columbia: University of South Carolina Press.
 2013. Text and Tradition in Performance and Writing. Biblical Performance Criticism Series 9. Eugene, OR: Cascade Books.
 2014. Jesus and Magic: Freeing the Gospel Stories from Modern Misconceptions. Eugene, OR: Cascade Books.

References

External links

Living people
New Testament scholars
University of Massachusetts Boston faculty
Wesleyan University faculty
Harvard University alumni
Year of birth missing (living people)